Makfax is an independent news agency in the Republic of North Macedonia. It is the first private news agency in North Macedonia and the South East European (SEE) region, founded in 1992. Starting from May 1993, it has been broadcasting news continuously for more than 15 years.

The journalist Risto Popovski is the founder of the agency, whereas Predrag Petrovikj is the editor-in-chief since 2017.

Makfax delivers information on events to some news media in the country and the region. On its portal, accessibility-wise, Makfax offers two types of news. The free-access news are available to all visitors of the site and to all subscribers of the electronic (e-mail) packages. Foreign embassies and missions in North Macedonia are the users of the specialized service packages and news.

The agency is a member of the South East Europe Media Organization (SEEMO), an affiliate of the International Press Institute (IPI).

Makfax, as an online medium, has 304,730 registered visitors. According to some analyses, there are 771,328 unique visits per month and over 1,000,000 page views. Based on these numbers, the agency is one of the most visited Macedonian informative sites and a main source of news.

Editorial staff 
The editorial staff of the agency is composed of professional reporters, translators as well as organizers.

References 

News agencies based in North Macedonia